Apaches of Paris is a 1927 French-German silent film directed by Nikolai Malikoff and starring Jaque Catelain and Charles Vanel.

It was shot at the Tempelhof Studios in Berlin and on location in Paris. The film's art direction was by Claude Autant-Lara and Vladimir Meingard. It premiered at the Gloria-Palast in Berlin.

Cast

References

Bibliography

External links

1927 films
Films of the Weimar Republic
German silent feature films
French silent feature films
UFA GmbH films
German black-and-white films
French black-and-white films
Films set in Paris
Films shot in Paris
Films shot at Tempelhof Studios